Fryda Wolff (born May 25, 1982) is an American voice actress.

Biography
Wolff attended Las Vegas Academy of the Arts High School during the same era as alumni Matthew Gray Gubler, Rutina Wesley, Baron Vaughn, and Ne-Yo. She identifies as queer and bisexual.

Filmography

Shows

Film

Video games

References

External links
 Fryda Wolff at Internet Movie Database

1982 births
21st-century American actresses
American video game actresses
American voice actresses
Living people
American bisexual actors
Bisexual actresses
American queer actresses